Gynurincola is a Gram-negative,  rod-shaped and endophytic genus of bacteria from the family of Chitinophagaceae with one known species (Gynurincola endophyticus). Gynurincola endophyticus has been isolated from the stem of the plant Gynura bicolor from Pixian in China.

References

Chitinophagia
Bacteria genera
Monotypic bacteria genera
Taxa described in 2019